The 1979 Ladies European Tour was the inaugural season of golf tournaments organised by the Women's Professional Golfers' Association (WPGA), which later became the Ladies European Tour (LET). The tour was principally sponsored by Carlsberg, who organised 12 36-hole tournaments counting towards their own Order of Merit. There were six other tournaments on the schedule including the Women's British Open, organised by the Ladies' Golf Union.

The Order of Merit was won by Cathy Panton, who finished just 1.5 points ahead of Women's British Open winner, Alison Sheard. Sheard topped the money list with almost £5,000 in winnings, over £1,000 more than runner-up Jane Panter. The Carlsberg Order of Merit was won by Christine Langford, who won three of the twelve events and finished as runner-up in two others.

Tournaments
The table below shows the 1979 schedule. The numbers in brackets after the winners' names show the number of career wins they had on the Ladies European Tour up to and including that event. This is only shown for members of the tour.

Major championship in bold.

Order of Merit and money list
The Order of Merit was based on a points system.

See also
1979 LPGA Tour

References

External links
Official site of the Ladies European Tour

Ladies European Tour
Ladies European Tour
Ladies European Tour